Octavia Victoria Rogers Albert (December 24, 1853 – August 19, 1889) was an African-American author and biographer. She documented slavery in the United States through a collection of interviews with ex-slaves in her book The House of Bondage, or Charlotte Brooks and Other Slaves, which was posthumously published in 1890.

Early life
She was born Octavia Victoria Rogers in Oglethorpe, Georgia, where she lived in slavery until the emancipation. She attended Atlanta University where she studied to be a teacher. Octavia Rogers saw teaching as a form of worship and Christian service. She received her first teaching job in Montezuma, Georgia.

Marriage and family 
In 1874, at around 21 years old, she married another teacher, Dr. Aristide Elphonso Peter Albert, and they had one daughter together, Laura T. Albert.  In 1875 Octavia converted to the African Methodist Episcopal Church, a church under the ministry of Henry McNeal Turner, a Congressman and prominent political activist. After her conversion, she then taught because she saw teaching as a form of worship and as a part of her Christian service like her fellow contemporaries. While teaching in Montezuma, Georgia, both she and her husband became strong advocates for education and "American religion" as they used their home to teach reading and writing lessons. Her husband became an ordained minister in the African Methodist Episcopal Church in 1877. Shortly after the couple married, they moved to Houma, Louisiana.

Publications

The House of Bondage, or Charlotte Brooks and Other Slaves 
This book was published in December 1890. Octavia Albert began conducting interviews with men and women in Houma, Louisiana, who were once enslaved. She met Charlotte Brooks for the first time in 1879 and decided to interview her later, along with other former slaves from Louisiana. These interviews were the raw material for her collection of narratives. Excerpts of this work were published in the Southwestern Christian Advocate.

Although most of the book focuses on the narrative of Charlotte Brooks, Albert also implemented the interviews from ex-slaves John Goodwin, Lorendo Goodwin, Lizzie Beaufort, Colonel Douglass Wilson, and a woman known as Hattie. Their interviews and experiences shaped her book The House of Bondage, or Charlotte Brooks and Other Slaves as a mix of slave stories that would expose the inhumanity of slavery and its effects on individuals. Albert's goal in writing her book was to tell the stories of slaves, their freedom, and adjustment into a changing society in order to "correct and create history." The stories of Charlotte Brooks and the others would eventually be compiled into a book after Octavia's death, published in New York by Hunt and Eaton in 1890. Octavia Albert died on August 19, 1889, before The House of Bondage became widely known.

See also
 Slave narrative

References

External links
The House of Bondage, or, Charlotte Brooks and Other Slaves, Original and Life-Like, As They Appeared in Their Old Plantation and City Slave Life, complete text of original 1890 edition, along with cover & title page images.

Historians of the United States
1853 births
1889 deaths
19th-century American slaves
African-American activists
American women historians
People from Oglethorpe, Georgia
People from Montezuma, Georgia
African-American educators
Atlanta University alumni
People from Houma, Louisiana
19th-century American historians
African-American historians
Historians from Georgia (U.S. state)
Historians from Louisiana
19th-century African-American women writers
19th-century American women writers
19th-century African-American writers